Parietaria judaica, with common names spreading pellitory or pellitory of the wall, is a species of herbaceous perennial plant in the family Urticaceae. The plant's pollen is highly allergenic. In Australia it is also known as asthma weed, due to the high incidence of allergy. It is unrelated to the herb pellitory (Anacyclus pyrethrum). It is easily confused with the very similar species Parietaria officinalis.

Etymology
Parietaria (Latin): Wall-dweller (a name used by the Roman naturalist and philosopher Pliny).
Judaica (Latin): Of Judaea, Jewish, from Palestine.

Description
 The biological form of Parietaria judaica is hemicryptophyte scapose, as its overwintering buds are situated just below the soil surface and the floral axis is more or less erect. This plant has pink or red hairy stems, woody at the base. The leaves are hairy, alternate, simple, entire and green, with smooth margins. The tiny white or pink flowers are attached to the stems. They are bisexual or unisexual, produced in clusters of three to many together in the leaf axils. The nickname sticky-weed is due to the adherent quality of the flowers and of the hairy stems; unlike some related species of the family Urticaceae, the hairs do not sting. The flowering period extends from spring through autumn, when it produces large amounts of pollen. The fruits are blackish achenes.

Distribution

Parietaria judaica is a native of Europe, central and western Asia and northern Africa.

Allergy 
Causes allergic reactions in some people.

Habitat
Generally considered a weed, it is often found on roadsides, along dry stone walls and in cracks of buildings and rock faces. However it might be useful in a habitat garden within its native range, as it is a larval food plant for red admiral butterflies (Vanessa atalanta). This species is wind pollinated. Seeds are adhesive and transported by insects as well as other animals, people and machines.

Gallery

References

External links
Jepson Manual Treatment: Parietaria judaica — invasive plant species Old link
Parietaria judaica — U.C. Photo gallery
Schede di bitanica

judaica
Flora of Asia
Flora of Australia
Flora of Europe
Flora of North Africa
Taxa named by Carl Linnaeus